The chestnut-bellied titi monkey (Plecturocebus caligatus) is a species of titi monkey, a type of New World monkey, endemic to Brazil. It was originally described as Callicebus caligatus in 1842.

References

chestnut-bellied titi
Mammals of Brazil
Endemic fauna of Brazil
chestnut-bellied titi
Taxa named by Johann Andreas Wagner